The second season of the Japanese animated television series Laid-Back Camp, based on the manga of the same name, sees the adventures of Nadeshiko Kagamihara and Rin Shima in their next camping trip following their first group camping with members of the Outdoor Activities Club last Christmas. Animated by C-Station, the season was directed by Yoshiaki Kyogoku from a series composition supervised by Jin Tanaka.

The season sees the return of cast members Yumiri Hanamori, Nao Tōyama, Sayuri Hara, Aki Toyosaki, Rie Takahashi, Marina Inoue, Shizuka Itō, and Risae Matsuda, with Tomoyo Kurosawa joining them as the voice of Ayano Toki, a childhood friend of Kagamihara. Akio Otsuka reprises his role from the first season as the narrator. A sequel to the 2018 anime TV series Laid-Back Camp was announced in October 2018.

The second season aired in Japan from January 7 to April 1, 2021, and consists of thirteen episodes. A third season was confirmed in October 2022.

Episodes

Cast and characters

Production

Development
Initial talks for a second season began during the airing of the first season of Laid-Back Camp due to its positive feedback, but the staff stated that another season was not possible "right away" due to their work schedule, while director Yoshiaki Kyogoku felt that it was "impossible" to happen. In July 2018, producer Shōichi Hotta was offered by FuRyu to lead the second season project despite being no longer affiliated with the company. Hotta then approached animation producer Ryoji Maru with a "big new" project, which consisted of the second season, a short anime, and a film, and discussed the season with writer Jin Tanaka and Kyogoku in an izakaya near C-Station's office.

In October 2018, the season was greenlit at the Yuru Camp Secret Society Blanket Enrollment Explanation Meeting, an event for the anime series. The returning staff included Kyogoku, Tanaka, character animation designer Mutsumi Sasaki, and cinematographer Hiroaki Tanaka. The season was produced by DeNA and animated by C-Station. In March 2020, the premiere of the season was announced to be in January 2021, with the date later revealed to be on January 7. The anime's official Twitter account confirmed that the season would consist of thirteen episodes.

Writing
The staff based the second season of Laid-Back Camp starting from the fifth volume of the manga series and included the concept of "family", which was found in those volumes, to complete its story. The season covered until the ninth volume. In an interview with Business Insider, Hotta explained that unlike the first one, which focused on the characters meeting each other and becoming friends, the second season would explore their individual "journey[s]" as they began to think about what they wanted to do, particularly Nadeshiko Kagamihara becoming interested in solo camping. This idea was based on a line from the fifth volume:  Hotta created two catchphrases for the season, which are "It's lonely, but also fun" and "It's fun, but also lonely".

Hotta, Kyogoku, and several other C-Station staff went on a camping trip to locations that would be featured in the season as part of their research and managed to complete it before the COVID-19 pandemic worsen. More than 10 scouting trips were conducted to various locations in Yamanashi and Shizuoka prefectures, and other places that the characters would be visiting in the season.

Casting
Yumiri Hanamori, Nao Tōyama, Sayuri Hara, Aki Toyosaki, Rie Takahashi, Marina Inoue, Shizuka Itō, and Risae Matsuda reprised their respective roles from the first season as Nadeshiko Kagamihara, Rin Shima, Chiaki Ōgaki, Aoi Inuyama, Ena Saitō, Sakura Kagamihara, Minami Toba, and Akari Inuyama, with Akio Otsuka also returning as the narrator and voice of Rin's grandfather. In August 2020, Tomoyo Kurosawa joined the cast as Nadeshiko's childhood friend named Ayano Toki. Tadahisa Fujimura and Masamichi Ureshino, directors of How Do You Like Wednesday?, made cameo appearances as a smelt fisherman and the manager of the campsite at Cape Ohmama.

Music

Akiyuki Tateyama returned as the composer of the second season. Asaka performed the opening theme music titled "Seize the Day", while Eri Sasaki sang the ending theme music titled , which both released on January 27, 2021. Sasaki revealed that the song was already recorded when she did a recording session with Hero Nakamura, co-creator of the first season's ending theme music, in September 2018. She also performed the insert song in the seventh episode titled

Marketing
A teaser trailer for the second season of Laid-Back Camp was released on September 21, 2020, followed by the second trailer on November 20. On November 29, 2020, advanced screening for the first episode was held in Marunouchi Piccadilly in Tokyo and streamed live in other 36 movie theaters in Japan. In December 2020, the Shizuoka Prefecture created two maps featuring model locations and campsites in the prefecture that would be introduced in the season. A full trailer for the series was released on December 23, 2020.

Release

Broadcast
The second season of Laid-Back Camp began airing in Japan on AT-X, Tokyo MX, BS11, Sun TV, and KBS Kyoto on January 7, 2021, on YBS on January 9, on Mie TV on January 10, on Hokkaido TV on January 11, and on SBS on January 12. The season was reaired on Tokyo MX and BS11 on April 7, 2022, and on HTB on April 14.

Home media
Ani-One began simulcasting the second season on their official YouTube channel, while Netflix began streaming it on June 30, 2021. In November 2022, the season became available to view on Amazon Prime Video in Japan.

The first volume of Blu-ray and DVD for the season was released in Japan on March 24, 2021. The second volume was released on May 26, 2021, which contains a new original video animation (OVA) titled Mystery Camp. The third and final volume was released on July 28, 2021, which contains the second OVA titled Traveling Rin Shima. Each of the volumes contains an episode of the director's cut version of  starring Otsuka and the camping program  starring Toyosaki.

Reception

Critical response
Steve Jones of Anime News Network reviewed the first three episodes of the second season of Laid-Back Camp, stating that the series was not just about camping but also a "travelogue about the sights and experiences of Japan outside of the major metropolitan areas", while Jones' colleague Theron Martin found the first episode "nothing... quite as funny as the better moments in the first season" but lauded the scenes, attention-to-detail camping tools, and "low-key" music. Stig Høgset of THEM Anime Reviews rated the season a complete 5 stars, stating that it was an "absolute masterpiece of a relaxed zen winter camping endorsement". Writing for Polygon, Julia Lee lauded the second season for being a "semi-educational show" like the first one and how it provided "fun looks into some cool areas of Japan", and dubbed it the "most comfy anime" in the last decade.

Accolades
In December 2021, the second season of Laid-Back Camp was among the Top 100 Favorites nominated for the Anime of the Year at the Tokyo Anime Award Festival 2022.

|-
! scope="row" | 2021
| Shanghai Television Festival
| Best Animation
| rowspan="2" | Laid-Back Camp (season 2)
| 
| 
|-
! scope="row" rowspan="3" | 2022
| rowspan="2" | Setsucon Anime Awards
| Sequel of the Year
| 
| rowspan="2" | 
|-
| Best Ship
| Rin × Nadeshiko
| 
|-
| Location Japan Award
| Special Award – Approval Rating
| Laid-Back Camp (season 2) × Shizuoka Prefecture
| 
| 
|-

Impact
The number of visitors to tourist facilities in Iwata, such as the torii gate at Fukuda Beach, Ryuyokaiyo Koen Auto Camping Ground, and Mitsuke Tenjin Shrine, had seen a significant increase due to the city being featured in the second season of Laid-Back Camp. According to Shizuoka Economic Research Institute in February 2023, an economic ripple effect of million was generated in Shizuoka after the prefecture collaborated with the series to hold a stamp rally featuring the locations visited by the characters in the second season, which was held from November 12, 2021, to March 21, 2022.

Original video animations

Notes

References

External links
  
 

C-Station
Camping in anime and manga
Medialink